Clarkton Depot is a historic train station located at Clarkton, Bladen County, North Carolina.  It was built as a passenger and freight station by the Seaboard Air Line Railroad in 1915.  It is a one-story, rectangular frame building measuring 30 feet by 90 feet.  The station served the SAL's daily passenger train from Wilmington to its Charlotte station in Charlotte via Hamlet and Monroe.

It was moved to the present site in October 1975. It was added to the National Register of Historic Places in 1987.

References

Seaboard Air Line Railroad stations
Railway stations on the National Register of Historic Places in North Carolina
Buildings and structures completed in 1915
Buildings and structures in Bladen County, North Carolina
National Register of Historic Places in Bladen County, North Carolina
1915 establishments in North Carolina
Former railway stations in North Carolina